Frequency conversion may refer to different processes affecting frequency of physical phenomena:

 A frequency changer,  an electronic device that converts alternating current (AC) of one frequency to alternating current of another frequency
 A variable-frequency drive,  a type of frequency changer
 Frequency conversion in nonlinear optics may refer to various manipulations of the frequency of light
 A Heterodyne is used in signal electronics to convert frequencies